Lynn Fitch (born October 5, 1961) is an American lawyer, politician, and the 40th Mississippi Attorney General. She is the first woman to serve in the role and the first Republican since 1878. Previously, she was the 54th State Treasurer of Mississippi from 2012 to 2020.

Personal life and early career
Fitch is a native of Marshall County, Mississippi, and grew up in Holly Springs, Mississippi. She attended University of Mississippi where she earned a Bachelor of Business Administration as well as her Juris Doctor, in five years. Fitch has two daughters and one son. She currently lives in Ridgeland, Mississippi.

Fitch has been a bond lawyer, worked for the Mississippi House of Representatives Ways and Means Committee as counsel, and as a special assistant attorney general with the Mississippi Attorney General's office. In 2009, Fitch was named the executive director of the Mississippi State Personnel Board by Governor Haley Barbour.

Political career

State Treasurer of Mississippi 
In the race for State Treasurer of Mississippi, Fitch defeated state Senator Lee Yancey in a runoff election for the Republican nomination on August 23, 2011. She went on to defeat Democrat Connie Moran in the November 8, 2011 general election with 59 percent of the vote.

Mississippi Attorney General 
Fitch announced her candidacy for Attorney General of Mississippi on March 14, 2018. In the Republican primary for this office, she defeated State Representative Mark Baker from Brandon, and Andy Taggart, former Chief of Staff to Governor Kirk Fordice and former Madison County Supervisor. Having defeated Democratic candidate Jennifer Riley Collins in the general election, Fitch is the first woman to serve as the state's Attorney General and the first Republican to serve in the office since 1878. She was sworn-in to the office on January 9, 2020.

After Joe Biden won the 2020 election and Donald Trump refused to concede while he and his allies made false claims of fraud, Fitch joined in the lawsuit seeking to overturn the 2020 election.

In 2021, in Dobbs v. Jackson Women's Health Organization, she requested that the Supreme Court overturn Roe v. Wade, a 1970s landmark abortion case. She called Roe v. Wade "egregiously wrong" and argued that the Court should allow a new Mississippi state law banning abortions after 15 weeks to come into effect. Fitch has argued that a ban on abortion would empower women and that abortion prevents women from reaching their full potential. Oral argument on behalf of Mississippi was delivered by Fitch's solicitor general, Scott Stewart. Outside the Supreme Court, the attorney general's office hosted a rally entitled "Empower Women Promote Life." In the months leading up to the oral arguments in the Dobbs case, Fitch authored a series of op-eds arguing against abortion. Her writing was published in the Wall Street Journal, USA Today, Dallas Morning News, The Washington Post, and (together with Monica Sparks, President of Democrats for Life of America) The Hill. Under Fitch, the Mississippi AG's office contracted to pay a D.C. law firm, as well as a Birmingham, Alabama public relations firm and an Alexandria, Virginia-based public relations consultant, up to $558,000 to support her efforts to defend Mississippi laws restricting abortion access.

Electoral history

References

External links

|-

1961 births
21st-century American politicians
21st-century American women politicians
Living people
Mississippi lawyers
Mississippi Attorneys General
Mississippi Republicans
People from Holly Springs, Mississippi
People from Madison, Mississippi
People from Ridgeland, Mississippi
State treasurers of Mississippi
University of Mississippi School of Law alumni
Women in Mississippi politics